Concordia Hall was a music venue in Baltimore, Maryland.  It was founded in 1866 by Germans from the largest immigrant community in that city. It was the location for readings by Charles Dickens in 1868, during his second visit to America., and other visiting lecturers and musical groups, and the site of civic events. Concordia Hall was located on Eutaw Street, south of German Street (now known as Redwood Street). 

The great Yiddish actor, Boris Thomashefsky, came to Baltimore in the mid-1880s and gave what was probably the first performance of Yiddish theater in Baltimore at Concordia Hall.  In his autobiography he left a description of the Hall: 

"...Concordia Hall, the aristocratic club of the Baltimore German Jews.  The Hall was truly a beauty.  No more beautiful hall have I seen even up to the present day.  There were more than one thousand seats, true theater seats.  The hall was decorated all in gold.  The seats were gilded and covered in red velvet.  The floors were spread with expensive carpets.  The stage was also gorgeous, bedecked with expensive decorations.  Huge gilt chandeliers lit the beautiful interior.  The dressing rooms were spacious, airy and lavishly furnished.  The entry to the theater was truly magnificent.  Wide steps of white marble with six marble columns on each side just like the White House in Washington.  It was in this spectacular palace where we would play our first Yiddish performance." (Translation by Daniel Setzer)

A fire destroyed the Corcordia in 1891.

References

 

Downtown Baltimore
Music venues in Baltimore
Former music venues in the United States
German-Jewish culture in Baltimore
Jewish theatres
1866 establishments in Maryland
Event venues established in 1866
Event venues disestablished in the 19th century
Yiddish culture in Maryland
Yiddish theatre in the United States